Kamalabad (also Romanized as Kamālābād) is a village in Kuhenjan Rural District, Kuhenjan District, Sarvestan County, Fars Province, Iran. At the 2006 census, its population was 453, in 112 families.

References 

Populated places in Sarvestan County